This is a list of Long Beach State 49ers football players in the NFL Draft.

Key

Draft picks

References

Long Beach State

Long Beach State 49ers in the NFL Draft
Long Beach State 49ers NFL Draft